George P. Dvorsky (born May 11, 1970) is a Canadian bioethicist, transhumanist and futurist. He is a contributing editor at io9 and producer of the Sentient Developments blog and podcast. He was chair of the board for the Institute for Ethics and Emerging Technologies (IEET) and is the founder and chair of the IEET's Rights of Non-Human Persons Program, a group that is working to secure human-equivalent rights and protections for highly sapient animals. He also serves on the Advisory Council of METI (Messaging Extraterrestrial Intelligence).

Dvorsky is a secular Buddhist, progressive environmentalist, ancestral health advocate, and animal rights activist. Primarily concerned with the ethical and sociological impacts of emerging technologies, specifically, "human enhancement" technologies; he seeks to promote open discussion for the purposes of education and foresight. He writes and speaks on a wide range of topics, including technoscience, ethics, existential risks, artificial intelligence, the search for extraterrestrial intelligence, and futurology, from a democratic transhumanist perspective.

Nonhuman rights and ethics

Uplift ethics 

Dvorsky presented an argument for non-human animal biological uplift at the IEET Human Enhancement Technologies and Human Rights conference at Stanford University in May 2006; and wrote the first published article in defence of the Ashley Treatment in November 2006, and subsequently the only bioethicist cited by Ashley X's parents in their defense.

Existential risk 
Dvorsky also presented an argument warning of the decline of democratic values and institutions in the face of existential and catastrophic risks at the Global Catastrophic Risks: Building a Resilient Civilization conference in November 2008.

Dysonian SETI 

Dvorsky, along with Milan M. Ćirković and Robert Bradbury, published a critique of SETI in the May 2012 Journal of the British Interplanetary Society (JBIS) arguing that SETI techniques and practices have become outdated. In its place, Dvorsky, Ćirković, and Bradbury advocated for what they called Dysonian SETI, namely the search for those signatures and artefacts indicative of highly advanced extraterrestrial life.

Space development 

Dvorsky has written extensively in favor of space exploration and has both promoted and criticized various Megascale engineering concepts.

Dyson sphere 

Dvorsky gained some notoriety in 2012 after writing about Dyson spheres, hypothetical structures intended to collect the entire energetic output of a star with solar power collectors. While Dvorsky presented it as a solution to humanity's resource needs including power and living space, Forbes blogger Alex Knapp and  astronomer Phil Plait, among others, have criticized Dvorsky's article.

Other publications including Popular Science, Vice, and skeptical blog Weird Things followed up on this exchange. None of them note the above numerical inaccuracies, although Weird Things does point out Plait's misunderstanding regarding bootstrapping, which Knapp agreed with in an update to his post. James Nicoll noted in his blog that Knapp seriously underestimated the area of a sphere.

Notes

References

External links 
 Will death die? Dvorsky as a guest on The Hour with George Stroumboulopoulos

1970 births
Canadian animal rights scholars
Canadian Buddhists
Canadian transhumanists
Futurologists
Living people